The AFL Wide Bay is an amateur Australian rules football competition that was formerly known as the "Bundaberg-Wide Bay Australian Football League", which was formed in 1987 through the merger of the "Bundaberg Australian Football League" and "Wide Bay Australian Football League". The competition currently featured teams from the cities of Bundaberg, Maryborough and Hervey Bay. 

Teams from Gympie and Pomona played in this competition up until 2006, before changing leagues. The representative team was known as the "Tigers", wearing guernseys similar to those of the Richmond Tigers. 

The competition was merged into the South East Queensland structure for the 2017 season.
It resumed under the banner of AFL Wide Bay once again in 2018. In 2021 it was managed by AFL Queensland.

AFL Wide Bay origins: the merger 
In 1985, the WBAFL played a five team competition which included teams from Hervey Bay (2), Cooloola Coast and Gympie (2), with Maryborough fielding junior grades.  The BAFL played a four team competition which included the three main clubs, Wests, Norths, and Souths (2) with Burnett Heads fielding Reserves and juniors only.

In 1986, the WBAFL played a four team competition, but finished the season with just two clubs, Hervey Bay and Gympie, who fielded just one senior club each that year.  Maryborough and Cooloola Coast folded.  The BAFL had only three senior teams, Wests, Norths and Souths (with Souths fielding just one A Grade team that year only), and so with backing of the Queensland Australian Football League, the two Leagues merged.

In 1987, the Bundaberg Wide Bay Australian Football League was formed with the five remaining senior clubs, Hervey Bay, Gympie, Norths, Wests and Souths, and the addition of Burnett Heads for  a few senior games, before being relegated to the Reserves after five rounds.

In 1988, Maryborough joined the competition to resume a six team competition.

A Grade Senior Premiers

Bundaberg Wide Bay AFL
 1987 West Bundaberg Bulldogs
 1988 Hervey Bay Bombers
 1989 Hervey Bay Bombers
 1990 Hervey Bay Bombers
 1991 Hervey Bay Bombers
 1992 Hervey Bay Bombers
 1993 Fraser Coast Lions
 1994 Hervey Bay Bombers
 1995 West Bundaberg Bulldogs
 1996 Hervey Bay Bombers
 1997 ATW Bundaberg Eagles
 1998 ATW Bundaberg Eagles
 1999 ATW Bundaberg Eagles

AFL Bundaberg Wide Bay
 2000 Hervey Bay Bombers
 2001 ATW Bundaberg Eagles
 2002 Hervey Bay Bombers
 2003 In recess
 2004 Hervey Bay Bombers
 2005 Hervey Bay Bombers
 2006 ATW Bundaberg Eagles
 2007 Hervey Bay Bombers
 2008 ATW Bundaberg Eagles

AFL Wide Bay
 2009 Hervey Bay Bombers
 2010 Brothers Bulldogs
 2011 ATW Bundaberg Eagles
 2012 Hervey Bay Bombers
 2013 Hervey Bay Bombers
 2014 ATW Bundaberg Eagles
 2015 ATW Bundaberg Eagles
 2016 ATW Bundaberg Eagles
 2017 In recess
 2018 Gympie Cats
 2019 Bay Power
 2020 ATW Bundaberg Eagles
 2021 Hervey Bay Bombers
 2022 Hervey Bay Bombers

Years in recess: 2003 and 2017 summary 
In 2003, four out of the eight clubs that played in a Brisbane League Division Three, were from AFL Bundaberg Wide Bay.  They were Hervey Bay Bombers, Maryborough Bears, Across The Waves Bundaberg, and Brothers Bulldogs from Bundaberg.  Gympie Cats and Pomona Demons had also previously played in the Wide Bay League. It was a competition which lasted only one season before the above mentioned six clubs, with the addition of new club, Bay Power, resulted in a revamped seven club League reforming the AFL Bundaberg Wide Bay competition the following year.

Hervey Bay Bombers won the Division Three Flag in 2003 beating ATW Bundaberg Eagles, with Maryborough Bears finishing third. The other two clubs in the competition were Bribie Island Bulldogs and Glasshouse Lions.

In 2017, a very similar set up to the 2003 Season took place. Hervey Bay Bombers, Across The Waves Bundaberg, Brothers Bulldogs and Bay Power, joined Sunshine Coast clubs, Maroochydore Roos, Gympie Cats and Pomona Demons, to form QFA Wide Bay-Sunshine Coast for just one season.  Maroochydore Roos defeated Brothers Bulldogs in the Grand Final, played at Gympie.  The AFL Wide Bay Reserves and Youth/Junior Grades continued under the banner of AFL Wide Bay. Gympie returned to play in the AFL Wide Bay competition in 2018, before leaving the competition once again.

A Grade Senior Mens Clubs

Merger of Two Bundaberg Clubs 
North Bundaberg Kangaroos played in this competition from 1987 until 1996 before merging with Souths. South Bundaberg Magpies (ATW Magpies 1996) played in this competition from 1987 until 1996 before merging with Norths.

From 1997 the new club was to be known as Across The Waves (ATW) Bundaberg - The Eagles.  The newly formed club won the A Grade Senior Flag in its first three seasons (1997-1999).

Former Teams

2009 AFL Wide Bay Ladder and Finals Results

2010 AFL Wide Bay Ladder and Finals Results

2011 AFL Wide Bay Ladder and Finals Results

2012 AFL Wide Bay Ladder and Finals Results

2013 Ladder

2014 Ladder

2015 Ladder

2016 Ladder

AFL Wide Bay A Grade Senior Mens Grand Finals 

NOTE: In both seasons of 2003 and 2017 all of the AFL Bundaberg Wide Bay Clubs participated in a Brisbane Competition before resuming the Regional League the following year.

AFL Wide Bay A Grade Senior Mens Grand Final Summary List 1987-2021

AFL Wide Bay Best and Fairest Award (Stedman Medal)

NOTE: The Stedman Medal was awarded in both seasons of 2003 and 2017, as all AFL Wide Bay clubs were playing each other, plus other teams from South East Queensland, but not under the banner of the AFL Wide Bay for those two seasons.

AFL Wide Bay Reserve Grade Mens Grand Finals

AFL Wide Bay Reserves Mens Grand Final Summary List 1987-2021 

Note:  The Reserve Grade Seniors Season was suspended after Round 8 in 2002, and was not contested from 2003-2004.

See also 
 Australian rules football in South East Queensland

References

External links 
 Official site

Australian rules football competitions in Queensland